Kieran O'Donnell (born 8 May 1963) is an Irish Fine Gael politician who has  served as a Minister of State since December 2022. He has been a Teachta Dála (TD) for the Limerick City constituency since the 2020 general election, and previously from 2011 to 2016 and from 2007 to 2011 for the Limerick East constituency. He was appointed Chair of the Committee on Transport and Communications Networks in September 2020. He was a Senator for the Cultural and Educational Panel from 2016 to 2020.

Before becoming a full-time public representative, O'Donnell worked as an accountant. He is a nephew of Tom O'Donnell, a former Minister and TD for Limerick East.

O'Donnell was an unsuccessful candidate at the 2002 Seanad election. He was elected on his first attempt to Limerick County Council for the Castleconnell local electoral area in 2004. He was first elected to Dáil Éireann at the 2007 general election.

In October 2007, O'Donnell was appointed party Deputy Spokesperson on Finance, with special responsibility for Freedom of Information, Procurement Reform and the Office of Public Works. As Deputy Spokesperson, O'Donnell was given the full Finance portfolio on an acting basis by Enda Kenny on 14 June 2010, when Kenny sacked Richard Bruton. O'Donnell subsequently supported Richard Bruton's leadership challenge to Enda Kenny. Following Kenny's victory in a motion of confidence, O'Donnell was not appointed to the front bench. In October 2010, he was appointed as party Deputy Spokesperson on Enterprise, Trade and Innovation, with special responsibility for Enterprise and Employment.

He lost his Dáil seat at the 2016 general election. He was subsequently elected to the Seanad for the Cultural and Educational Panel, where he served as the Fine Gael Seanad Spokesperson on Finance. He regained his Dáil seat following the 2020 general election.

In December 2022, he was appointed as Minister of State at the Department of Housing, Local Government and Heritage with special responsibility for Local Government and Planning following the appointment of Leo Varadkar as Taoiseach.

See also
Families in the Oireachtas

References

External links

Kieran O'Donnell's page on the Fine Gael website

 

1963 births
Living people
Alumni of the University of Limerick
Fine Gael TDs
Local councillors in County Limerick
Members of the 25th Seanad
Members of the 30th Dáil
Members of the 31st Dáil
Members of the 33rd Dáil
People educated at St Munchin's College
Fine Gael senators
Ministers of State of the 33rd Dáil